D.I.T.C. is the debut studio album by American New York-based hip hop collective Diggin' in the Crates Crew. It was released on February 22, 2000 via Tommy Boy Records. It features contributions from all the eight members of the group: Lord Finesse, Showbiz and A.G., Diamond D, Fat Joe, O.C., Buckwild and the late Big L, as well as Big Pun, Milano, Cuban Link, KRS-One, and production from DJ Premier, Amed Harris and Rockwilder. The album peaked at number 141 on the Billboard 200, number 31 on the Top R&B/Hip-Hop Albums and number 9 on the Independent Albums in the United States.

The album produced three promotional singles: "Day One", which was released in 1997, "Get Yours" and "Way of Life", both released in 1999. Its lead single, "Thick", made it to number 37 on the US Hot Rap Songs chart. The album's closer, "Tribute", is a tribute track to member Lamont "Big L" Coleman, who was murdered on February 15, 1999.

Track listing

Sample credits
"Get Yours" contains a sample of "Don't Mess With People", written by Louis Wilson, Ricardo Wilson and Carlos Wilson, performed by Mandrill
"Where Ya At" contains elements from "The Endless Enigma", written by Keith Emerson, Greg Lake and Carl Palmer, performed by Emerson, Lake & Palmer
"Way of Life" contains a sample of "Polarizer", written by Joseph Thomas, Lance Quinn and Brad Baker, performed by Joe Thomas
"Champagne Thoughts" contains elements from "Police Woman Theme", written by Morton Stevens, performed by Johnny Gregory Orchestra

Notes
"Drop It Heavy" has previously appeared on A.G.'s 1999 album The Dirty Version
"Stand Strong" is an uncredited remix of D.I.T.C.'s 1998 song "Dignified Soldiers", written by Lamont Coleman, Robert Hall, Andre Barnes, Omar Credle and Rodney Lemay, performed by Big L, Lord Finesse, A.G. and O.C.
Japanese version of the album has the same tracklist as its European version, except the 15th track, "Time to Get This Money", is replaced with "Q & A"
"Da Enemy" was re-released as "The Enemy" on Big L's posthumous album The Big Picture

Charts

References

External links

2000 debut albums
Tommy Boy Records albums
Albums produced by Buckwild
Albums produced by Diamond D
Albums produced by DJ Premier
Albums produced by Rockwilder
Albums produced by Lord Finesse
Diggin' in the Crates Crew albums
Albums produced by Showbiz (producer)